R v Pittwood [1902] is a case in English criminal law as to omission, specifically the duty to act to save others from physical harm, finding an omission that amounted to manslaughter.

Facts
Railway crossing keeper, Pittwood, failed in his duty (by contract owed to his employer) to close a level crossing gate, leading to the death of a wagon driver after a train crashed into his horse and cart.

Judgment
He was found guilty of manslaughter.

Mr Justice Wright ruled that depending on the facts, such as the contract in this case, there is a duty to act in the criminal law to save others from physical harm, including in the law of manslaughter.

References

P
1902 in case law
1902 in British law